Vadim Vitalyevich Zhelobnyuk (born April 22, 1989) is a Russian former ice hockey goaltender. He played in the Russian Superleague and Kontinental Hockey League for HC Dynamo Moscow.

Honours
IIHF World U18 Championship:  2007

International statistics

References

External links

1989 births
HC Almaty players
HC Dynamo Moscow players
Gazprom-OGU Orenburg players
Living people
Neftyanik Almetyevsk players
Russian ice hockey goaltenders
Russian people of Ukrainian descent
HC Ryazan players
Yertis Pavlodar players